Jonathan Brown (born 24 April 1990 in South Africa) is a professional footballer, who currently plays for Edinburgh United.

He has previously played for Heart of Midlothian, Livingston, Stirling Albion, and Brechin City.

Career
Having come through the youth team ranks at Heart of Midlothian, Brown joined Livingston  on a season-long loan in August 2009 and whilst at the club scored his first Scottish League goal in January 2010 against Elgin City. He ended the season with a Third Division Championship medal.

The following season, he joined Stirling Albion, again for a season-long loan, but this time at First Division level. The season finished disappointingly with relegation as the club finished bottom of the table.

On 8 July 2011 Brown left Hearts and joined Livingston on a one-year deal after releasing himself from his contract.

In July 2012 Brown joined Brechin City. He was released by Brechin on 6 May 2014.

In June 2014, Brown signed for Junior club Bonnyrigg Rose.

Brown announced his retirement from football on 24 April 2021 after missing most of the 2020-21 season through injury. Brown came out of retirement in December 2021. He was loaned to Dundonald Bluebell for a few weeks to pick up his fitness. He was still under contract with Rose during his retirement.

The defender signed for Edinburgh United in 2022.

International career
Brown has represented Scotland at under-16, under-18 and under-19 levels. He was last capped at under-19 international level, playing in the 2009 UEFA European Under-19 Football Championship elite qualification. He is also eligible to represent South Africa at international level.

References

External links
 
 

Living people
1990 births
Association football defenders
Scottish people of South African descent
British sportspeople of South African descent
Scottish Football League players
Scottish footballers
Heart of Midlothian F.C. players
Livingston F.C. players
Brechin City F.C. players
Bonnyrigg Rose Athletic F.C. players
Stirling Albion F.C. players
Edinburgh United F.C. players
Scottish Professional Football League players
Scotland youth international footballers
Scottish Junior Football Association players
Scotland junior international footballers